Rasdhoo (Dhivehi: ރަސްދޫ) (Rasdu in the Admiralty Charts) is an inhabited island of the Maldives. It is also the capital of the Alif Alif Atoll administrative division.

Geography
It is the only inhabited island of a small natural atoll known as Rasdhoo, Rasdu or Ross Atoll located a few miles off NE Ari Atoll.

Demography

Economy
As of September 2016, Rasdhoo has sixteen guesthouses.

Transport
The island can be reached by ferry thrice a week from Malé or by daily speedboats between Malé and Rasdhoo.

See also 
 Bodufulhadhoo
 Feridhoo
 Himandhoo
 Maalhos
 Mathiveri
 Ukulhas

References

 Divehi Tārīkhah Au Alikameh. Divehi Bahāi Tārikhah Khidmaiykurā Qaumī Markazu. Reprint 1958 edn. Malé 1990. 
 Divehiraajjege Jōgrafīge Vanavaru. Muhammadu Ibrahim Lutfee. G.Sōsanī.
 Xavier Romero-Frias, The Maldive Islanders, A Study of the Popular Culture of an Ancient Ocean Kingdom. Barcelona 1999.

Further reading

Islands of the Maldives
Alif Alif Atoll

de:Rasdhoo-Atoll